Bernhard Klemens Maria Grzimek (24 April 1909 – 13 March 1987) was a German zoo director, zoologist, book author, editor,  and animal conservationist in postwar West Germany.

Biography

Early years and education
Grzimek was born in Neisse (Nysa), Prussian Silesia. His father Paul Franz Constantin Grzimek was a lawyer and civil law notary and his mother was Margarete Margot (nee Wanke).

After studying veterinary medicine in 1928, first at Leipzig and later in Berlin, Grzimek received a doctorate in 1933.

He married Hildegard Prüfer on 17 May 1930 and had three sons: Rochus, Michael, and an adopted son, Thomas.

In 1978, Bernhard Grzimek married Erika Grzimek, his son Michael's widow, and adopted the two children Stephan Michael (b. 1956), and Christian Bernhard (b. 1959, after Michael's death).

World War II and aftermath

During the Second World War he was a veterinarian in the Wehrmacht and worked for the Reichsernährungsministerium (Food Ministry of the 3rd Empire) in Berlin. In early 1945, the Gestapo raided Grzimek's Berlin apartment, because he had repeatedly supplied food to hidden Jews. Grzimek then fled from Berlin to Frankfurt, which was occupied by the U.S. Army. In April 1945 he was appointed police chief of Frankfurt by U.S. authorities, but he refused the job.

In late 1947, Grzimek was accused of membership in the NSDAP (the Nazi Party) by the U.S. military government, which he denied. He was then removed from office in the Frankfurt Zoo, fined, and sent for denazification. On 23 March 1948, it was determined that he was innocent (Category 5; Exonerated). He was then reinstated at the Zoo by the U.S. government but his reputation was compromised as there was a NSDAP entry as a candidate but not as a member; following a 1949 lawsuit Grzimek was given a fine. According to Nowak, Grzimek had tried to join the party out of fear, to save himself.

Zoo director

Grzimek became director of the Frankfurt Zoological Garden on 1 May 1945. With the zoo then in ruins and all but 20 animals killed, he prevented the permanent closure of the Frankfurt Zoo and the relocation of the "Center Zoo" to the outskirts. The Zoo reopened on 1 July 1945, after all bomb craters had been filled and buildings temporarily restored. With festivals, dances and actors, Grzimek attracted the Frankfurt population, while receiving the assent of the Provisional Government and the U.S. military to continue the Zoo. He led the Zoo for 29 years, until his retirement on 30 April 1974. He made it into one of the largest zoological gardens in Germany.

At the same time he served as president of the Frankfurt Zoological Society, this for over forty years. The society – organized on similar principles as its London and New York counterparts – runs a number of wildlife conservation projects both in Germany and overseas; most well-known is its ongoing work in the Serengeti ecosystem in Tanzania, East Africa.

Conservationism and other activities

In 1954 he founded the image agency Okapia, which specializes in science, animals and nature. Today the agency employs 650 photographers, and is led by Christian Bernhard Grzimek, Bernhard Grzimek's grandson.

Grzimek is significant for the conservation work he undertook in the Serengeti. He spent several years studying its wildlife there alongside his son Michael, especially on observation and counts of large scale annual migrations. The documentary film Serengeti Shall Not Die was written and directed by Bernard and Michael Grzimek and won the Academy Award for Documentary Feature in 1959.

In the same year Michael was killed in an air crash while flying the Dornier Do 27 because of a collision with a griffon vulture. Grzimek wrote a best-selling book, Serengeti Shall Not Die, which first appeared in German in 1959 and later in 20 other languages. Its popularity was key in driving the creation of the Serengeti National Park. In the book he prophesied:

In 1975 he co-founded the League for the Environment and Nature Conservation (BUND) and bought ten acres of forest and wetlands in the Steiger forest near Michelau im Steigerwald which he left wild.

In 1978 he married his son's widow, Erika. He subsequently adopted his grandsons as sons.

Death

Grzimek died in Frankfurt am Main in 1987 while watching a circus performance with a group of children. His ashes were later transferred to Tanzania and buried next to his son Michael at the Ngorongoro Crater. In his lifetime, he had wished that after his death, his body would be laid out on the African plains to be eaten by scavengers.

Publications

Grzimek was the editor-in-chief of (and author of a number of articles in) Grzimek's Animal Life Encyclopedia, a massive and monumental encyclopedia of animal life. After publication in Germany in 1968,  the encyclopedia was translated into English  and published in 1975 in 13 volumes (covering lower life forms, insects and other invertebrates, fish, amphibia, reptiles, birds and mammals) plus three additional volumes on Ecology, Ethology and Evolution. The 1975 work was issued in both hardback and less expensive paperback editions and became a standard reference work. After Grzimek's death, the volumes on mammals were revised, and republished in both German and then in English. In 2004, the entire encyclopedia was revised and published in a new and expanded edition with Michael Hutchins as the new editor in chief. All the versions of the encyclopedia are marked by clear and forceful prose, extensive use of illustrations (both drawings and color plates), and a deep love and concern for animal conservation.

Of national importance were his work as co-editor (together with Austrian Nobel-prize winner Konrad Lorenz) of the then-largest popular magazine on animals and wildlife in German language, Das Tier (German for "The Animal") and of a very popular television series on wildlife. He also authored a large number of popular books based on his countless experiences with animals which he raised since his student days, managed as zoo director, and encountered in the wild during many research trips.

Awards and honors
 1956: 2 Golden Bear´s for Kein Platz für wilde Tiere in the categories International Documentary and Audience Award
 1956: German Film Award for Kein Platz für wilde Tiere
 1959: Golden Screen for the television program Ein Platz für Tiere
 1960: Academy Award (Oscar) for Serengeti darf nicht sterben in the category Documentary
 1960: Honorary Professor at the Veterinary Faculty Justus-Liebig-Universität Gießen
 1960: Honorary doctorate from Humboldt University of Berlin, "Dr. met. vet. h. c."
 1960: Honorary Member of the Scientific Society of Veterinary Medicine of the GDR (WGV)
 1963: Gold Medal from New York Zoological Society for "outstanding services in conservation of nature“
 1964: Wilhelm Bölsche-Medal for services to the dissemination of science in Germany
 1968: Tie Man of the Year
 1969: Grand Federal Cross of Merit
 1969: Goldene Kamera
 1973: Bambi
 1978: Inauguration of the new nocturnal animal house in the Frankfurt Zoo under the name Grzimek-House
 1981: Honorary Professor of Lomonosov University
 2008: Renaming of a portion of the Frankfurt street Am Tiergarten in Bernhard-Grzimek-Allee

Works

Films 
1956 - Kein Platz für wilde Tiere 
1959 - Serengeti shall not die (Original German title: Serengeti darf nicht sterben) 
1956 - 1980 - Ein Platz für Tiere (German TV series)

Books 
1941 - Wir Tiere sind ja gar nicht so! Franckh'sche Verlagshandlung 
1943 - Wolf Dschingis: Neue Erlebnisse, Erkenntnisse und Versuche mit Tieren, Franckh'sche Verlagshandlung  
1951 - Affen im Haus und andere Tierberichte, Franckh'sche Verlagshandlung 
1952 - Flug ins Schimpansenland: Reise durch ein Stück Afrika von heute, Franckh'sche Verlagshandlung 
1956 - 20 Tiere und ein Mensch 
1956 - Thulo aus Frankfurt - Rund um die Giraffe, Franckh'sche Verlagshandlung 
1959 - Serengeti darf nicht sterben (über die Arbeit am Film) 
1960 - Kein Platz für wilde Tiere 
1961 - Unsere Brüder mit den Krallen 
1963 - Wir lebten mit den Baule. Flug ins Schimpansenland 
1965 - Wildes Tier, weißer Mann 
1968 - Grzimeks Tierleben, 16 vol. 
1969 - Grzimek unter Afrikas Tieren: Erlebnisse, Beobachtungen, Forschungsergebnisse 
1974 - Auf den Mensch gekommen: Erfahrungen mit Leuten 
1974 - Vom Grizzlybär zur Brillenschlange: Ein Naturschützer berichtet aus vier Erdteilen, Kindler 
1974 - Einsatz für Afrika: Neue Erlebnisse mit Wildtieren, Kindler 
1974 - Tiere, mein Leben: Erlebnisse und Forschungen aus fünf Jahrzehnten, Harnack 
1975 - Grzimek's Animal Life Encyclopedia, 13 vol., Van Nostrand Reinhold Company, New York [translation of 1968 work]
1977 - Und immer wieder Pferde. Kindler 
1988 - Grzimeks Enzyklopädie der Säugetiere, Kindler Verlag, München.
1990 - Grzimek's Encyclopedia of Mammals, 5 vol., McGraw-Hill, New York,  [translation of 1988 work]
2004 - Grzimek's Animal Life Encyclopedia, 2nd. Ed., 17 vol., Thomson-Gale, Detroit,  [revision of 1975 work]

Magazines 
 since 1960 - Das Tier (joint editor with Konrad Lorenz und Dr. Heini Hediger)

See also 
 Michael Grzimek

Further reading 
 Franziska Torma: Eine Naturschutzkampagne in der Ära Adenauer. Bernhard Grzimeks Afrikafilme in den Medien der 50er Jahre. Martin Meidenbauer Verlag, München 2004,   (Media studies; on his films  on African wildlife)
 Gerhard Grzimek, Rupprecht Grzimek: "Die Familie Grzimek aus Oberglogau in Oberschlesien", in: Deutsches Familienarchiv, Band X, Verlag Degener & Co., Neustadt (Aisch) 1958.  4., erweiterte und überarbeitete Ausgabe, Herder-Institut, Reutlingen 2000.  (genealogy)

Film 
In 2004 and 2008 public German TV broadcast 2 documentaries on Grzimek, and in 2015 an almost 3 hour long biopic featuring Ulrich Tukur as Bernhard Grzimek.

Documentaries 
 Thomas Weidenbach: Bernhard Grzimek – Ein Leben für die Tiere. ZDF 2004; ca. 54 Minuten 
 Erika Kimmel, Bernd Isecke: Legenden – Bernhard Grzimek. ARD 2008; 45 Minuten

Biopic 
 Roland Suso Richter: Grzimek. ARD 2015; 165 Minuten. Mit Ulrich Tukur als Hauptdarsteller.

External links 
 Biography in English
 Bernhard Grzimek - sein Leben - Biography in PDF-format (2,8 MB), including photographs. 
 Private Homepage of Dirk Petzold on the Frankfurt Zoo 
 Audio und Manuskript: Wie Bernhard Grzimek 1945 den Frankfurter Zoo rettete 
 ZDF: Bernhard Grzimek - Eine deutsche Legende 
 Würdigung durch seinen "Haussender" Hessischer Rundfunk 
 Würdigung seines Sohnes Michael durch den Hessischen Rundfunk

References

1909 births
1987 deaths
20th-century German zoologists
German conservationists
German documentary filmmakers
Hessischer Rundfunk people
People from Nysa, Poland
People from the Province of Silesia
Leipzig University alumni
Humboldt University of Berlin alumni
Directors of Best Documentary Feature Academy Award winners
Knights Commander of the Order of Merit of the Federal Republic of Germany
Zoo directors